The 2009 Mitsubishi Electric Europe Cup was a professional tennis tournament played on outdoor red clay courts. It was part of the 2009 ATP Challenger Tour. It took place in Monza, Italy between 6 and 12 April 2009.

Singles entrants

Seeds

 Rankings are as of March 23, 2009.

Other entrants
The following players received wildcards into the singles main draw:
  Andrea Arnaboldi
  Stefano Ianni
  Dejan Katić
  Filippo Volandri

The following players received entry from the qualifying draw:
  Alberto Brizzi
  Albert Ramos-Viñolas
  Daniel Silva
  Robin Vik
  Iñigo Cervantes-Huegun (as a Lucky loser)

Champions

Men's singles

 David Marrero def.  Antonio Veić, 5–7, 6–4, 6–4

Men's doubles

 James Auckland /  Travis Rettenmaier def.  Dušan Karol /  Jaroslav Pospíšil, 7–5, 6–7(6), [10–4]

References
2009 Draws
Official website
ITF search 

Mitsubishi Electric Europe Cup
Internazionali di Monza E Brianza